Jesse James Rodríguez Franco (born January 20, 2000) is an American professional boxer, who has held the WBC super flyweight title in 2022. As of September 2022, he is ranked as the world's third best junior bantamweight by The Ring, the second best by TBRB and as the fourth best by Boxrec. As an amateur, he won a silver medal at the 2015 Junior World Championships.

Professional boxing career

Early career
During his amateur career, Rodríguez won two U.S. National Youth Championships (in 2015 and 2016), as well as the 2016 U.S. Junior Open Tournament. At the international level, he won the silver medal at the 2015 Junior World Championships.

Rodríguez made his professional debut against Mauricio Cruz on March 10, 2017, winning by unanimous decision. By the end of 2019, Rodríguez amassed a 10–0 record, with six of those victories coming by way of stoppage.

Rodríguez was scheduled to face Marco Sustaita on February 29, 2020, on the undercard of the Mikey Garcia versus Jessie Vargas bout. Rodríguez won the fight by eighth-round technical knockout. Rodríguez was next scheduled to face the one-time WBC light flyweight title challenger Janiel Rivera on September 5, 2020. He won the fight by a first-round knockout, managing to drop Rivera three times by the 2 minute mark of the opening round. Rodríguez was scheduled to fight Saul Juarez on December 12, 2020, on the undercard of the Shakur Stevenson and Toka Kahn Clary junior lightweight bout. Rodríguez lived up to his role as the significant betting favorite, knocking Juarez out in the second.

Rodríguez was expected to challenge the reigning WBA (Regular) champion Esteban Bermudez in late 2021, however the fight was later cancelled as it didn't receive approval from the WBA. Rodríguez was instead scheduled to face Jose Alejandro Burgos on October 16, 2021, whom he beat by a fourth-round knockout.

WBC super flyweight champion

Rodriguez vs. Cuadras
Rodriguez was expected to face Fernando Diaz for the WBC USNBC flyweight title on February 5, 2022, on the undercard of the WBC super-flyweight title bout between Srisaket Sor Rungvisai and Carlos Cuadras. Soon after this fight was revealed, it was announced that Rodriguez had signed a promotional deal with Eddie Hearn's Matchroom Boxing. On January 31, it was announced that Srisaket had withdrawn from his bout with Cuadras, and would be replaced on a five-days notice by Rodriguez. It was Rodriguez's first super-flyweight fight since December 1, 2018. Rodriguez won the fight by unanimous decision. Two judges scored the fight 117–110 for him, while the third judge scored the bout 115–112 in his favor. He scored the sole knockdown of the fight in the third round, flooring the former titleholder with a right uppercut. Winning the title made Rodriguez the youngest active titlist in the sport.

Rodriguez vs. Sor Rungvisai
Rodriguez was scheduled to make his first title defense against the former The Ring magazine, lineal and WBC super flyweight champion Srisaket Sor Rungvisai on June 25, 2022. The title bout was booked as the main event of a DAZN broadcast card, which took place at the Tech Port Arena in San Antonio, Texas. Rodriguez won the fight by an eight-round technical knockout, stopping Sor Rungvisai with a flurry of punches at the 1:50 minute mark. He knocked his opponent down once prior to the stoppage, dropping Sor Rungvisai with a left hook a minute into the seventh round. Rodriguez outlanded Sor Rungvisai in both total punches landed (233 to 84) and power punches landed (119 to 72). Following this victory, Rodriguez extended his contract with Matchroom Boxing.

Rodriguez vs. González
Rodriguez made his second title defense against the three-time super flyweight world title challenger, and the #10 ranked WBC contender, Israel González. The fight was scheduled as the co-headliner of the Canelo Álvarez vs. Gennady Golovkin III DAZN pay per view, which took place at the T-Mobile Arena in Paradise, Nevada on September 17, 2022. Rodriguez retained his title by unanimous decision, with scores of 118–109, 117–110 and 114–113. He was deducted a point in the eight round for landing a low blow, which left González on the canvas. González was dropped with a low blow in the eleventh round as well, although no point was deducted. 

On October 26, 2022, it was announced by the WBC that Rodriguez had vacated the super flyweight title in order to compete at flyweight.

Flyweight

Rodriguez vs. Gonzalez
On October 28, 2022, the WBO ratings committee approved a request for Rodriguez to be ranked as the top contender at flyweight and immediately challenge for the title. As Junto Nakatani vacated the belt in order to move up to super flyweight, the sanctioning body ordered a vacant title bout between Rodriguez and Cristian Gonzalez, their #2 ranked flyweight contender. The fight is scheduled to take place on April 8, 2023, at the Boeing Center at Techport in San Antonio, Texas.

Professional boxing record

See also
List of world super-flyweight boxing champions
List of Mexican boxing world champions

References

External links

Jesse Rodríguez Franco - Profile, News Archive & Current Rankings at Box.Live

2000 births
Living people
American male boxers
Boxers from Texas
Light-flyweight boxers
Super-flyweight boxers
World super-flyweight boxing champions
World Boxing Council champions
Sportspeople from San Antonio
Southpaw boxers